In Greek mythology, Titanis is an obscure figure who is connected to Artemis, the goddess of the hunt. Her existence and myth is only attested in Euripides, an Athenian playwright of the fifth century BC.

Family 
The only thing known about her family is a father named Merops.

Mythology 
According to Euripides, the beautiful Titanis was changed by Artemis into a golden-antlered deer and expelled from her group on account of her beauty. The brief passage is very ambiguous, as it is not entirely clear what Euripides meant when he wrote that Artemis kicked her out on account of her beauty; it could be that Titanis bragged about being more beautiful than Artemis, or her beauty attracted the attention of Zeus, or Artemis got jealous of her. The similarity to another myth, that of Artemis turning the nymph Taygete into a doe in order to help her escape from the advances of Zeus, has also been noted. Titanis's own nature is questionable, as Euripides names her father as Merops, but given that her name translates to "female Titan", he could be designating her as a Titaness without naming her.

See also 

 Antigone of Troy
 Callisto
 Gerana

References

Bibliography 
 
 
 
 

Deeds of Artemis
Retinue of Artemis
Women in Greek mythology
Metamorphoses into animals in Greek mythology
Epithets of Artemis